The men's water polo tournament at the 2013 World Aquatics Championships, organised by the FINA, was held in the Piscines Bernat Picornell in Barcelona, Spain from 23 July to 3 August 2013.

Hungary won their third title by defeating Montenegro 8–7 in the final match.

Qualification
16 teams qualified for the world championships in 2013 as follows:
 The host nation
 The best 2 teams in the 2012 World League not already qualified as the host nation
 The best 4 teams in the 2012 Olympics not already qualified as the host nation or from the World League
 The best 3 teams in the 2012 European Championships not already qualified as the host nation, from the World League, or from the Olympics
 The best 2 teams in the 2013 Americas Qualification Tournament not already qualified as the host nation, from the World League, or from the Olympics
 The best 2 teams from Asia (qualification system yet to be organised) not already qualified as the host nation, from the World League, or from the Olympics
 The best team from Africa (qualification system yet to be organised) not already qualified as the host nation, from the World League, or from the Olympics
 The best team from Oceania (qualification system yet to be organised) not already qualified as the host nation, from the World League, or from the Olympics
 If no team enters from a continent or if a team qualified as the host nation, from the World League, or from the Olympics does not enter, then each vacancy shall be filled by the next highest placed team(s) from the continental qualification tournament with the following rotation: Americas, Europe, Host Continent (Europe), Asia, Oceania and Africa.

Groups formed
The draw resulted in the following groups:

Preliminary round

Group A

Group B

Group C

Group D

Knockout stage

Bracket

5th place bracket

Round of 16

Quarterfinals

5th–8th place semifinals

Semifinals

Seventh place game

Fifth place game

Third place game

Final

Final ranking

Medalists

Individual awards
Most Valuable Player
 Dénes Varga

Best Goalscorer
 Sandro Sukno /  Aleksandar Ivović – 20 goals

Best Goalkeeper
 Viktor Nagy

Media All-Star Team
 Viktor Nagy – Goalkeeper
 Duško Pijetlović – Centre forward
 Pietro Figlioli
 Aleksandar Ivović
 Mlađan Janović
 Sandro Sukno
 Dénes Varga

References

External links
 15th FINA World Championships 2013 FINA Water Polo website
Records and statistics (reports by Omega)
 Men Water Polo XV World Championship 2013 Barcelona www.todor66.com

2013
Men